Two Mothers for Zachary is a 1996 ABC television film directed by Peter Werner and starring Valerie Bertinelli and Vanessa Redgrave. It is a true story adaptation of the Bottoms v. Bottoms family custody battle brought by a mother who disapproves of her daughter's lesbianism and the impact on her grandchild. It premiered on 22 September 1996. It was awarded a GLAAD Media Award for Outstanding Made for TV Movie.

Premise
Nancy (Redgrave) disapproves of her daughter, Jody Ann's (Bertinelli) lesbianism and resolves to seek custody of her grandson, Zachary. A Virginia court grants custody of the boy to Nancy and now Jody is desperate to regain her son.

Cast
 Valerie Bertinelli as Jody Ann Shaffell
 Vanessa Redgrave as Nancy Shaffell
 Colleen Flynn as Maggie Fergus
 Brian McGuire as Dwayne
 Kim Dickens as Jan
 Marietta Marich as Melba
 Marco Perella as Reporter 2
 James Gammon as Chalmer
Adam and Aaron Rehmann as Zachary

Production
Although the film is based on Sharon Bottoms's real-life custody battle, characters were renamed for the adaptation. Bertinelli explained, "I'm so much older than Sharon Bottoms is. But once we changed her name to Jody Ann Shaffell, it became much easier to see myself playing this role. I didn't have to play Sharon Bottoms but my interpretation of what would happen to a woman in that situation."

Bertinelli had previously learned of the Bottoms case years earlier when she appeared on the same edition of Larry King Live with Sharon Bottoms. Bottoms was appearing with her lawyer and argued her case against a Christian leader. Instead of concentrating on what she was intending to promote, Bertinelli became engaged in the previous debate and criticized the views of the religious representative.

References

External links
 

1996 drama films
1996 LGBT-related films
1996 films
1996 television films
American LGBT-related films
Films directed by Peter Werner
Child custody
Films set in Virginia
LGBT in Virginia
LGBT-related drama films
LGBT-related films based on actual events
American drama television films
1990s American films